The Japanese Association of Supporting Streetchildren (JASS) is a non-governmental organisation based in Huế, Vietnam. It was formed by a Japanese teacher, Michio Koyama, in 1994 with the aim of helping street children get an education and a better standard of living.

History

Mr Michio Koyama visited Vietnam in 1992 where he first encountered the street children who were (and still are) rife on the streets of Ho Chi Minh City and other places across the country. One year later he left Tokyo and moved to Huế, taking on a job at the university teaching English. Using the money he earned, he had a house built which was used to shelter children who needed somewhere to stay. The house opened for use in 1994, and as of 2004 over 300 children had passed through. They received shelter, food, schooling and guidance.

The aim is to make any children who join the project self-sufficient by the time they are 18 years of age. If any chose to continue into further education / university then exceptions can be made to help them with funding.

JASS predominantly helps children in the Huế Province.

Mr Koyama was the first Japanese person to be made a citizen of Huế.

Fundraising

Most funds come from Japanese sources. Private individual donations and corporate sponsorship make up the bulk of these with government grants also helping.

A restaurant, called simply Japanese Restaurant, is located at 34 Ð Tran Cao Van. Staff are partially made up of trainees and "graduates" from JASS. Proceeds from the restaurants go to the charity, a little like the KOTO restaurant in Hanoi, or the Blue Dragon restaurant in Hội An.

See also
 Child poverty
 KOTO
 Blue Dragon Children's Foundation
 Street children
 List of non-governmental organizations in Vietnam

References
Lonely Planet "Vietnam" 9th ed. (Aug 2007), page 220

External links
 JASS web page (english version)

Organizations established in 1994
Children's charities based in Vietnam
Street children